Stan(ley) Ross may refer to:

Ysaiah Ross, educator
Stanley Ralph Ross (1935–2000), American writer, announcer and comedian
Stan Ross (studio executive), co-owner of Gold Star Studios
Stanley Ross, American indie songwriter
Stan Ross (lacrosse), American lacrosse coach

See also
 Stan Rose